Louis Daniel Arnault de Nobleville (21 December 1701, Orléans – 1 February 1778) was a French physician and naturalist.

Louis Daniel Arnault de Nobleville was born into an orléanaise family whose wealth came from sugar refinery. He studied medicine in Reims and in 1744 entered the Collège de Médecine d'Orléans where he undertook research with François Salerne (1705–1760). He was charged by the Généralité d'Orléans with preventing and fighting epidemic disease and became a Correspondant of the Société royale de Médecine shortly after its foundation. Aside from medicine he was interested in music and natural history.

He was also a good player on the viola da gamba.

Works
Aëdologie, ou Traité du rossignol franc, ou chanteur... (later translated into German and Dutch)
1756 Histoire naturelle des animaux Desaint et Saillant, Paris
 Manuel des Dames de charité, ou Formules de médicamens faciles à préparer, dressées en faveur des personnes charitables.

References

Histoire et mémoires de la Société royale de Médecine, année 1777, pp. 45–52 (Article nécrologique de Louis Daniel Arnault de Nobleville, qui donne le 24 décembre 1701 pour sa date de naissance, et le 29 janvier 1778 pour sa date de décès)
Encyclopédie méthodique. Médecine, par une société de médecins, Paris, Panckoucke, 1790.
Jacob (Jacques-Philippe), Catalogue Des Livres de la Bibliothèque de feu M[essi]re. Louis-Daniel Arnault de Nobleville, Docteur en Médecine à Orléans, rue de Recouvrance, Orléans, Jacques-Philippe Jacob, 1780, 108 p., 1014 numéros.
Beauvais de Préau (Charles-Nicolas), Mémoires Pour servir à l'éloge de M. Arnault de Nobleville, docteur en médecine, aggrégé [sic] au Collége des médecins d'Orléans, associé-correspondant de la Société Royale de Médecine, ancien notable député à l'Hôtel-de-Ville d'Orléans, et ancien administrateur de l'Hôtel-Dieu de la même ville, s. l., J.F.A.Y, s. d. (entre 1778 et 1794), 16 p., pp. 9–10.

French ornithologists
18th-century French physicians
Scientists from Orléans
1701 births
1778 deaths
18th-century French writers
18th-century French male writers
French male writers
Physicians from Orléans